Rabbi Shefatya ben Amitai (lit. Shefatya the son of Amitai) was a Hebrew-language liturgical poet.

Biography
Born in Italy, he lived in Oria, Apulia, southern Italy. It is reported that he performed the legendary deed of treating the daughter of the Byzantine emperor Basil I. This is purported to have occurred c. 873 when he traveled to Constantinople to plead for the annulment of anti-Jewish decrees issued by the Byzantine Emperor Basil I.

Liturgical works
His only known liturgical poem is Yisrael Nosha which according to the Ashkenazi tradition is included in the closing service on Yom Kippur (the Day of Atonement).

See also
Ahimaaz ben Paltiel#Chronicle of Ahimaaz - Chronicle of Ahimaaz

Further reading
Otzar HaGedolim entry 774 - רבנא שפטיה בן רבנא אמיתי
Toledot HaPaytanim (Hebrew edition)

9th-century Italian rabbis
9th-century Italian physicians
Medieval Jewish physicians
Byzantine Jews
People from the Province of Brindisi